Michelle Larkin (born 1967) is an American lawyer and judge from Minnesota.  She serves as a Judge of the Minnesota Court of Appeals.

Early life and education
Larkin earned her undergraduate degree from University of Minnesota in 1988 and worked for the Minnesota House of Representatives Judiciary Committee in the 1989 and 1990 legislative sessions.  Larkin earned her J.D. from William Mitchell College of Law in 1992, graduating magna cum laude.

Career
She then worked as an attorney (1992–2001) and senior attorney and trial team supervisor (2001–2005) in the Hennepin County Public Defender's office.

Judicial service
Larkin was appointed to the district court bench by Tim Pawlenty on November 10, 2005.  Pawlenty announce her appointment to the Court of Appeals on June 24, 2008, to the seat previously occupied by Christopher Dietzen, whom Pawlenty had named to the Minnesota Supreme Court. Larkin was reelected in 2010 and 2016.

References

1967 births
Living people
American women judges
Minnesota lawyers
Minnesota Court of Appeals judges
University of Minnesota alumni
William Mitchell College of Law alumni
21st-century American women